The Colorado Rockies' 2011 season, the franchise's 19th in Major League Baseball, was a season in American baseball. They did not return to the postseason for the third time in five years after also missing in 2010.

Offseason
November 16, 2010: Manuel Corpas was released by the Colorado Rockies.
November 18, 2010: Clint Barmes was traded by the Colorado Rockies to the Houston Astros for Felipe Paulino.
December 2, 2010: José López was traded by the Seattle Mariners to the Colorado Rockies for Chaz Roe.
December 7, 2010: Ty Wigginton was signed as a free agent by the Colorado Rockies.
December 23, 2010: Matt Lindstrom was traded by the Houston Astros to the Colorado Rockies for Jonnathan Aristil (minors) and Wes Musick (minors).
January 24, 2011: Clayton Mortensen was traded by the Oakland Athletics to the Colorado Rockies for Ethan Hollingsworth (minors).

Regular season

Season standings

National League West

Record vs. opponents

Transactions
May 19, 2011: Franklin Morales was sold by the Colorado Rockies to the Boston Red Sox.
May 26, 2011: Felipe Paulino was sold by the Colorado Rockies to the Kansas City Royals.
June 7, 2011: José López was released by the Colorado Rockies.
June 30, 2011: Mark Ellis was traded by the Oakland Athletics to the Colorado Rockies for Bruce Billings and a player to be named later.  The Colorado Rockies sent Eliezer Mesa (minors) (September 30, 2011) to the Oakland Athletics to complete the trade.
July 30, 2011: Ubaldo Jiménez was traded by the Colorado Rockies to the Cleveland Indians for Alex White, Matt McBride, Joe Gardner (minors), and a player to be named later.  The Cleveland Indians sent Drew Pomeranz (August 16, 2011) to the Colorado Rockies to complete the trade.
August 8, 2011: Kevin Millwood was signed as a free agent by the Colorado Rockies.
August 23, 2011: Kevin Kouzmanoff was traded by the Oakland Athletics to the Colorado Rockies for a player to be named or cash.

Major League debuts
Batters:
Charlie Blackmon (Jun 7)
Cole Garner (Jul 4)
Jordan Pacheco (Sep 6)
Wilin Rosario (Sep 6)
Tommy Field (Sep 11)
Héctor Gómez (Sep 16)
Pitchers:
Alan Johnson (Apr 17)
Bruce Billings (May 27)
Juan Nicasio (May 28)
Rex Brothers (Jun 6)
Drew Pomeranz (Sep 11)

Roster

Game log

|-  bgcolor="ffbbbb"
|- align="center" bgcolor="ffbbbb"
| 1 || April 1 || Diamondbacks || 7–6 (11) || Demel (1–0) || M. Reynolds (0–1) || Putz (1) || 49,374 || 0–1
|- align="center" bgcolor="bbffbb"
| 2 || April 2 || Diamondbacks || 3–1 || de la Rosa (1–0) || Hudson (0–1) || Street (1) || 40,216 || 1–1
|- align="center" bgcolor="bbbbbb"
| – || April 3 || Diamondbacks || colspan=6 | Postponed (rain/snow) Rescheduled for May 24
|- align="center" bgcolor="bbffbb"
| 3 || April 5 || Dodgers || 3–0 || Chacín (1–0) || Kershaw (1–1) || Street (2) || 24,693 || 2–1
|- align="center" bgcolor="bbffbb"
| 4 || April 6 || Dodgers || 7–5 || Hammel (1–0) || Billingsley (1–1) || Street (3) || 22,595 || 3–1
|- align="center" bgcolor="bbffbb"
| 5 || April 7 || @ Pirates || 7–1 || Rogers (1–0) || Maholm (0–1) || || 39,219 || 4–1
|- align="center" bgcolor="ffbbbb"
| 6 || April 8 || @ Pirates || 4–3 (14) || Olson (1–1) || Morales (0–1) || || 29,192 || 4–2
|- align="center" bgcolor="bbffbb"
| 7 || April 9 || @ Pirates || 6–4 || Belisle (1–0) || Veras (0–1) || Lindstrom (1) || 25,398 || 5–2
|- align="center" bgcolor="bbffbb"
| 8 || April 10 || @ Pirates || 6–5 || Chacín (2–0) || Crotta (0–1) || Street (4) || 18,043 || 6–2
|- align="center" bgcolor="bbffbb"
| 9 || April 11 || @ Mets || 7–6 || Belisle (2–0) || Parnell (0–1) || Street (5) || 24,865 || 7–2
|- align="center" bgcolor="bbbbbb"
| – || April 12 || @ Mets || colspan=6 | Postponed (rain) Rescheduled for April 14
|- align="center" bgcolor="bbffbb"
| 10 || April 13 || @ Mets || 5–4 || Rogers (2–0) || Niese (0–2) || Street (6) || 25,878 || 8–2
|- align="center" bgcolor="bbffbb"
| 11 || April 14 || @ Mets || 6–5 || G. Reynolds (1–0) || Dickey (1–2) || Lindstrom (2) || || 9–2
|- align="center" bgcolor="bbffbb"
| 12 || April 14 || @ Mets || 9–4 || de la Rosa (2–0) || Capuano (1–1) || || 25,758 || 10–2
|- align="center" bgcolor="bbffbb"
| 13 || April 15 || Cubs || 5–0 || Chacín (3–0) || Garza (0–2) || || 30,285 || 11–2
|- align="center" bgcolor="ffbbbb"
| 14 || April 16 || Cubs || 8–3 || Coleman (1–0) || Hammel (1–1) || || 40,264 || 11–3
|- align="center" bgcolor="bbffbb"
| 15 || April 17 || Cubs || 9–5 || Betancourt (1–0) || Mateo (0–1) || || 42,212 || 12–3
|- align="center" bgcolor="ffbbbb"
| 16|| April 18 || Giants || 8–1 || Lincecum (2–1) || Rogers (2–1) || || 31,079 || 12–4
|- align="center" bgcolor="ffbbbb"
| 17 || April 19 || Giants || 6–3 || Sánchez (2–1) || Jiménez (0–1) || Wilson (5) || 30,320 || 12–5
|- align="center" bgcolor="bbffbb"
| 18 || April 20 || Giants || 10–2 || de la Rosa (3–0) || Cain (2–1) || || 27,758 || 13–5
|- align="center" bgcolor="ffbbbb"
| 19 || April 22 || @ Marlins || 4–1 || Sánchez (1–1) || Chacín (3–1) || || 15,069 || 13–6
|- align="center" bgcolor="bbffbb"
| 20 || April 23 || @ Marlins || 3–1 || Hammel (2–1) || Vázquez (1–2) || Street (7) || 35,381 || 14–6
|- align="center" bgcolor="ffbbbb"
| 21 || April 24 || @ Marlins || 6–3 || Dunn (1–0) || Belisle (2–1) || Núñez (6) || 11,442 || 14–7
|- align="center" bgcolor="bbffbb"
| 22 || April 25 || @ Cubs || 5–3 || Rogers (3–1) || Garza (0–3) || Street (8) || 37,417 || 15–7
|- align="center" bgcolor="bbffbb"
| 23 || April 26 || @ Cubs || 4–3 || de la Rosa (4–0) || Russell (1–3) || Street (9) || 38,261 || 16–7
|- align="center" bgcolor="bbbbbb"
| – || April 27 || @ Cubs || colspan=6 | Postponed (rain) Rescheduled for June 27
|- align="center" bgcolor="ffbbbb"
| 24 || April 29 || Pirates || 3–0 || Correia (4–2) || Chacín (3–2) || Hanrahan (8) || 34,477 || 16–8
|- align="center" bgcolor="bbffbb"
| 25 || April 30 || Pirates || 4–1 || Hammel (3–1) || Maholm (1–4) || Street (10) || 33,684 || 17–8
|-

|-  bgcolor="ffbbbb"
|- align="center" bgcolor="ffbbbb"
| 26 || May 1 || Pirates || 8–4 || Morton (3–1) || Jiménez (0–2) || || 35,012 || 17–9
|- align="center" bgcolor="ffbbbb"
| 27 || May 3 || @ Diamondbacks || 4–3 || Hernandez (1–0) || Paulino (0–1) || Putz (7) || 18,887 || 17–10
|- align="center" bgcolor="bbffbb"
| 28 || May 4 || @ Diamondbacks || 6–4 || Chacín (4–2) || Enright (1–3) || Street (11) || 18,803 || 18–10
|- align="center" bgcolor="ffbbbb"
| 29 || May 5 || @ Diamondbacks || 3–2 (11) || Hernandez (2–0) || Belisle (2–2) || || 18,695 || 18–11
|- align="center" bgcolor="ffbbbb"
| 30 || May 6 || @ Giants || 4–3 || Wilson (1–1) || Paulino (0–2) || || 41,982 || 18–12
|- align="center" bgcolor="ffbbbb"
| 31 || May 7 || @ Giants || 3–2 || Wilson (2–1) || Paulino (0–3) || || 41,611 || 18–13
|- align="center" bgcolor="ffbbbb"
| 32 || May 8 || @ Giants || 3–0 || Vogelsong (2–0) || de la Rosa (4–1) || Wilson (11) || 42,132 || 18–14
|- align="center" bgcolor="bbffbb"
| 33 || May 9 || Mets || 2–1 || Belisle (3–2) || Capuano (2–4) || Street (12) || 31,885 || 19–14
|- align="center" bgcolor="ffbbbb"
| 34 || May 10 || Mets || 4–3 || Pelfrey (3–3) || Hammel (3–2) || Rodríguez (10) || 31,007 || 19–15
|- align="center" bgcolor="bbbbbb"
| – || May 11 || Mets || colspan=6 | Postponed (rain) Rescheduled for May 12
|- align="center" bgcolor="ffbbbb"
| 35 || May 12 || Mets || 9–5 || Niese (2–4) || Jiménez (0–3) || || 21,422 || 19–16
|- align="center" bgcolor="bbffbb"
| 36 || May 13 || Padres || 12–7 || de la Rosa (5–1) || Moseley (1–5) || || 40,278 || 20–16
|- align="center" bgcolor="ffbbbb"
| 37 || May 14 || Padres || 9–7 || Adams (2–0) || Street (0–1) || Bell (9) || 34,252 || 20–17
|- align="center" bgcolor="ffbbbb"
| 38 || May 15 || Padres || 8–2 || Latos (1–5) || Hammel (3–3) || || 38,109 || 20–18
|- align="center" bgcolor="bbffbb"
| 39 || May 16 || Giants || 7–4 || Mortensen (1–0) || Lincecum (3–4) || Street (13) || 33,228 || 21–18
|- align="center" bgcolor="bbffbb"
| 40 || May 17 || Giants || 5–3 || Belisle (4–2) || Sánchez (3–3) || Street (14) || 41,105 || 22–18
|- align="center" bgcolor="ffbbbb"
| 41 || May 18 || @ Phillies || 2–1 || Hamels (5–2) || de la Rosa (5–2) || Madson (7) || 44,665 || 22–19
|- align="center" bgcolor="bbffbb"
| 42 || May 19 || @ Phillies || 7–1 || Chacín (5–2) || Kendrick (3–3) || || 45,425 || 23–19
|- align="center" bgcolor="ffbbbb"
| 43 || May 20 || @ Brewers || 7–6 (14) || McClendon (1–0) || Paulino (0–4) || || 33,361 || 23–20
|- align="center" bgcolor="ffbbbb"
| 44 || May 21 || @ Brewers || 3–2 || Marcum (6–1) || Mortensen (1–1) || Axford (11) || 42,240 || 23–21
|- align="center" bgcolor="ffbbbb"
| 45 || May 22 || @ Brewers || 3–1 || Wolf (4–4) || Jiménez (0–4) || Axford (12) || 42,605 || 23–22
|- align="center" bgcolor="bbffbb"
| 46 || May 24 || Diamondbacks || 12–4 || G. Reynolds (2–0) || Collmenter (3–1) || || 26,378 || 24–22
|- align="center" bgcolor="ffbbbb"
| 47 || May 24 || Diamondbacks || 5–2 || Saunders (1–5) || Chacín (5–3) || Putz (13) || 25,096 || 24–23
|- align="center" bgcolor="ffbbbb"
| 48 || May 25 || Diamondbacks || 2–1 || Kennedy (6–1) || Hammel (3–4) || Putz (14) || 26,972 || 24–24
|- align="center" bgcolor="ffbbbb"
| 49 || May 26 || Diamondbacks || 6–3 || Owings (1–0) || Mortensen (1–2) || Hernandez (1) || 30,186 || 24–25
|- align="center" bgcolor="ffbbbb"
| 50 || May 27 || Cardinals || 10–3 || Westbrook (5–3) || Jiménez (0–5) || || 31,285 || 24–26
|- align="center" bgcolor="bbffbb"
| 51 || May 28 || Cardinals || 15–4 || Nicasio (1–0) || García (5–1) || || 38,149 || 25–26
|- align="center" bgcolor="ffbbbb"
| 52 || May 29 || Cardinals || 4–3 || Lohse (7–2) || Chacín (5–4) || Salas (9) || 40,598 || 25–27
|- align="center" bgcolor="ffbbbb"
| 53 || May 30 || @ Dodgers || 7–1 || Billingsley (4–4) || Hammel (3–5) || || 36,962 || 25–28
|- align="center" bgcolor="ffbbbb"
| 54 || May 31 || @ Dodgers || 8–2 || Lilly (4–4) || Mortensen (1–3) || || 31,473 || 25–29
|-

|-  bgcolor="ffbbbb"
|- align="center" bgcolor="bbffbb"
| 55 || June 1 || @ Dodgers || 3–0 || Jiménez (1–5) || Garland (1–5) || || 36,975 || 26–29
|- align="center" bgcolor="ffbbbb"
| 56 || June 3 || @ Giants || 3–1 || Cain (4–4) || Nicasio (1–1) || Wilson (16) || 41,021 || 26–30
|- align="center" bgcolor="bbffbb"
| 57 || June 4 || @ Giants || 2–1 || Chacín (6–4) || Bumgarner (2–7) || Street (15) || 41,046 || 27–30
|- align="center" bgcolor="ffbbbb"
| 58 || June 5 || @ Giants || 2–1 || Vogelsong (4–1) || Lindstrom (0–1) || Wilson (17) || 41,369 || 27–31
|- align="center" bgcolor="bbffbb"
| 59 || June 6 || @ Padres || 3–0 || Mortensen (2–3) || Richard (2–7) || Street (16) || 16,838 || 28–31
|- align="center" bgcolor="ffbbbb"
| 60 || June 7 || @ Padres || 2–0 || Stauffer (2–4) || Jiménez (1–6) || Bell (17) || 17,732 || 28–32
|- align="center" bgcolor="bbffbb"
| 61 || June 8 || @ Padres || 5–3 || Lindstrom (1–1) || Bell (2–2) || Street (17) || 17,220 || 29–32
|- align="center" bgcolor="bbffbb"
| 62 || June 9 || Dodgers || 9–7 || Betancourt (2–0) || Elbert (0–1) || Street (18) || 26,066 || 30–32
|- align="center" bgcolor="bbffbb"
| 63 || June 10 || Dodgers || 6–5 || Chacín (7–4) || Billingsley (5–5) || Street (19) || 32,116 || 31–32
|- align="center" bgcolor="ffbbbb"
| 64 || June 11 || Dodgers || 11–7 || Lilly (5–5) || Hammel (3–6) || || 34,290 || 31–33
|- align="center" bgcolor="ffbbbb"
| 65 || June 12 || Dodgers || 10–8 || De La Rosa (3–0) || Jiménez (1–7) || Elbert (1) || 32,650 || 31–34
|- align="center" bgcolor="ffbbbb"
| 66 || June 13 || Padres || 3–1 || Bass (1–0) || Cook (0–1) || Bell (18) || 32,395 || 31–35
|- align="center" bgcolor="bbffbb"
| 67 || June 14 || Padres || 6–3 || Nicasio (2–1) || LeBlanc (0–2) || || 35,045 || 32–35
|- align="center" bgcolor="bbffbb"
| 68 || June 15 || Padres || 6–3 || Chacín (8–4) || Latos (4–8) || || 35,877 || 33–35
|- align="center" bgcolor="bbffbb"
| 69 || June 17 || Tigers || 13–6 || Hammel (4–6) || Porcello (6–5) || || 41,594 || 34–35
|- align="center" bgcolor="bbffbb"
| 70 || June 18 || Tigers || 5–4 || Jiménez (2–7) || Coke (1–7) || Street (20) || 48,555 || 35–35
|- align="center" bgcolor="ffbbbb"
| 71 || June 19 || Tigers || 9–1 || Verlander (9–3) || Cook (0–2) || || 49,015 || 35–36
|- align="center" bgcolor="bbffbb"
| 72 || June 20 || @ Indians || 8–7 || Lindstrom (2–1) || Carmona (4–9) || Street (21) || 15,224 || 36–36
|- align="center" bgcolor="bbffbb"
| 73 || June 21 || @ Indians || 4–3 || Belisle (5–2) || Perez (2–3) || Street (22) || 15,877 || 37–36
|- align="center" bgcolor="ffbbbb"
| 74 || June 22 || @ Indians || 4–3 || Tomlin (9–4) || Hammel (4–7) || Perez (18) || 17,568 || 37–37
|- align="center" bgcolor="bbffbb"
| 75 || June 24 || @ Yankees || 4–2 || Jiménez (3–7) || Burnett (7–6) || Street (23) || 46,028 || 38–37
|- align="center" bgcolor="ffbbbb"
| 76 || June 25 || @ Yankees || 8–3 || Sabathia (10–4) || Cook (0–3) || || 46,900 || 38–38
|- align="center" bgcolor="ffbbbb"
| 77 || June 26 || @ Yankees || 6–4 || Logan (2–2) || Belisle (5–3) || Rivera (20) || 47,894 || 38–39
|- align="center" bgcolor="ffbbbb"
| 78 || June 27 || @ Cubs || 7–3 || Garza (4–6) || Chacín (8–5) || || 40,854 || 38–40
|- align="center" bgcolor="bbffbb"
| 79 || June 28 || White Sox || 3–2 (13) || Brothers (1–0) || Ohman (0–1) || || 40,175 || 39–40
|- align="center" bgcolor="ffbbbb"
| 80 || June 29 || White Sox || 3–2 || Bruney (1–0) || Street (0–2) || Santos (16) || 35,973 || 39–41
|- align="center" bgcolor="ffbbbb"
| 81 || June 30 || White Sox || 6–4 (10) || Crain (4–2) || Mortensen (2–4) || Santos (17) || 38,084 || 39–42
|-

|-  bgcolor="ffbbbb"
|- align="center" bgcolor="bbffbb"
| 82 || July 1 || Royals || 9–0 || Nicasio (3–1) || Duffy (1–3) || || 48,282 || 40–42
|- align="center" bgcolor="bbffbb"
| 83 || July 2 || Royals || 9–6 || G. Reynolds (3–0) || Davies (1–7) || Street (24) || 49,227 || 41–42
|- align="center" bgcolor="ffbbbb"
| 84 || July 3 || Royals || 16–8 || Wood (4–0) || Hammel (4–8) || || 40,269 || 41–43
|- align="center" bgcolor="ffbbbb"
| 85 || July 4 || @ Braves || 4–1 || Hanson (10–4) || Jiménez (3–8) || Kimbrel (25) || 36,137 || 41–44
|- align="center" bgcolor="ffbbbb"
| 86 || July 5 || @ Braves || 5–3 || Lowe (5–6) || Chacín (8–6) || Kimbrel (26) || 17,718 || 41–45
|- align="center" bgcolor="ffbbbb"
| 87 || July 6 || @ Braves || 9–1 || Jurrjens (12–3) || Cook (0–4) || || 26,271 || 41–46
|- align="center" bgcolor="ffbbbb"
| 88 || July 7 || @ Braves || 6–3 || Hudson (8–6) || Nicasio (3–2) || Kimbrel (27) || 21,541 || 41–47
|- align="center" bgcolor="bbffbb"
| 89 || July 8 || @ Nationals || 3–2 || Hammel (5–8) || Lannan (5–6) || Street (25) || 19,046 || 42–47
|- align="center" bgcolor="bbffbb"
| 90 || July 9 || @ Nationals || 2–1 || Jiménez (4–8) || Marquis (7–4) || Street (26) || 29,441 || 43–47
|- align="center" bgcolor="ffbbbb"
| 91 || July 10 || @ Nationals || 2–0 || Zimmermann (6–7) || Chacín (8–7) || Storen (23) || 21,186 || 43–48
|- align="center" bgcolor="bbffbb"
| 92 || July 14 || Brewers || 12–3 || Jiménez (5–8) || Gallardo (10–6) || || 41,088 || 44–48
|- align="center" bgcolor="bbffbb"
| 93 || July 15 || Brewers || 4–0 || Nicasio (4–2) || Narveson (6–6) || || 35,044 || 45–48
|- align="center" bgcolor="ffbbbb"
| 94 || July 16 || Brewers || 8–7 || Rodríguez (3–2) || Street (0–3) || Axford (24) || 46,783 || 45–49
|- align="center" bgcolor="ffbbbb"
| 95 || July 17 || Brewers || 4–3 || Marcum (8–3) || Cook (0–5) || Axford (25) || 35,030 || 45–50
|- align="center" bgcolor="ffbbbb"
| 96 || July 18 || Braves || 7–4 || Lowe (6–7) || Hammel (5–9) || Kimbrel (29) || 35,103 || 45–51
|- align="center" bgcolor="bbffbb"
| 97 || July 19 || Braves || 12–3 || Jiménez (6–8) || Beachy (3–2) || || 36,460 || 46–51
|- align="center" bgcolor="bbffbb"
| 98 || July 20 || Braves || 3–2 || Street (1–3) || O'Flaherty (1–3) || || 39,339 || 47–51
|- align="center" bgcolor="ffbbbb"
| 99 || July 21 || Braves || 9–6 || Hanson (11–5) || M. Reynolds (0–2) || Kimbrel (30) || 39,262 || 47–52
|- align="center" bgcolor="bbffbb"
| 100 || July 22 || @ Diamondbacks || 8–4 || Cook (1–5) || Hudson (10–6) || || 22,768 || 48–52
|- align="center" bgcolor="ffbbbb"
| 101 || July 23 || @ Diamondbacks || 12–3 || Collmenter (6–5) || Hammel (5–10) || || 34,849 || 48–53
|- align="center" bgcolor="ffbbbb"
| 102 || July 24 || @ Diamondbacks || 7–0 || Owings (4–0) || Jiménez (6–9) || Duke (1) || 28,090 || 48–54
|- align="center" bgcolor="ffbbbb"
| 103 || July 25 || @ Dodgers || 8–5 || De La Rosa (4–4) || Nicasio (4–3) || Guerra (8) || 28,860 || 48–55
|- align="center" bgcolor="ffbbbb"
| 104 || July 26 || @ Dodgers || 3–2 || Kershaw (12–4) || Chacín (8–8) || Jansen (2) || 50,664 || 48–56
|- align="center" bgcolor="bbffbb"
| 105 || July 27 || @ Dodgers || 3–1 || Cook (2–5) || Kuroda (6–13) || Street (27) || 29,976 || 49–56
|- align="center" bgcolor="bbffbb"
| 106 || July 29 || @ Padres || 3–2 || Hammel (6–10) || Stauffer (6–8) || Street (28) || 27,612 || 50–56
|- align="center" bgcolor="bbffbb"
| 107 || July 30 || @ Padres || 10–6 || Rogers (4–1) ||  Harang (9–3) || || 37,034 || 51–56
|- align="center" bgcolor="ffbbbb"
| 108 || July 31 || @ Padres || 8–3 || Qualls (5–5) || Brothers (1–1) || || 22,516 || 51–57
|-

|-  bgcolor="ffbbbb"
|- align="center" bgcolor="ffbbbb"
| 109 || August 1 || Phillies || 4–3 (10) || Bastardo (5–0) || Brothers (1–2) || Madson (19) || 39,330 || 51–58
|- align="center" bgcolor="ffbbbb"
| 110 || August 2 || Phillies || 5–0 || Kendrick (6–5) || Cook (2–6) || || 39,128 || 51–59
|- align="center" bgcolor="ffbbbb"
| 111 || August 3 || Phillies || 8–6 || Halladay (14–4) || Hammel (6–11) || Lidge (1) || 39,404 || 51–60
|- align="center" bgcolor="bbffbb"
| 112 || August 4 || Nationals || 6–3 || Rogers (5–1) || Detwiler (1–1) || || 35,956 || 52–60
|- align="center" bgcolor="ffbbbb"
| 113 || August 5 || Nationals || 5–3 || Zimmermann (7–9) || Nicasio (4–4) || Storen (28) || 35,034 || 52–61
|- align="center" bgcolor="bbffbb"
| 114 || August 6 || Nationals || 15–7 || Chacín (9–8) || Hernández (6–11) || || 43,321 || 53–61
|- align="center" bgcolor="ffbbbb"
| 115 || August 7 || Nationals || 3–2 || Clippard (2–0) || Belisle (5–4) || Storen (29) || 34,812 || 53–62
|- align="center" bgcolor="bbffbb"
| 116 || August 8 || @ Reds || 10–7 || Belisle (6–4) || Bray (2–2) || Street (29) || 27,055 || 54–62
|- align="center" bgcolor="bbffbb"
| 117 || August 9 || @ Reds || 3–2 || Rogers (6–1) || Willis (0–2) || Betancourt (1) || 17,378 || 55–62
|- align="center" bgcolor="ffbbbb"
| 118 || August 10 || @ Reds || 3–2 || Leake (10–7) || Millwood (0–1) || Cordero (21) || 21,673 || 55–63
|- align="center" bgcolor="ffbbbb"
| 119 || August 11 || @ Reds || 2–1 || Cueto (8–5) || Chacín (9–9) || Cordero (22) || 20,546 || 55–64
|- align="center" bgcolor="ffbbbb"
| 120 || August 12 || @ Cardinals || 6–1 || Lohse (10–7) || Cook (2–7) || || 36,181 || 55–65
|- align="center" bgcolor="bbffbb"
| 121 || August 13 || @ Cardinals || 6–1 || Hammel (7–11) || García (10–6) || || 40,172 || 56–65
|- align="center" bgcolor="ffbbbb"
| 122 || August 14 || @ Cardinals || 6–2 || Jackson (9–8) || Rogers (6–2) || || 38,748 || 56–66
|- align="center" bgcolor="bbffbb"
| 123 || August 15 || Marlins || 7–4 || Belisle (7–4) || Núñez (1–3) || || 32,175 || 57–66
|- align="center" bgcolor="ffbbbb"
| 124 || August 16 || Marlins || 6–5 || Sánchez (7–6) || Chacín (9–10) || Núñez (33) || 36,136 || 57–67
|- align="center" bgcolor="bbffbb"
| 125 || August 17 || Marlins || 12–5 || Cook (3–7) || Nolasco (9–9) || || 33,522 || 58–67
|- align="center" bgcolor="ffbbbb"
| 126 || August 19 || Dodgers || 8–2 || Kuroda (9–14) || Hammel (7–12) || || 44,984 || 58–68
|- align="center" bgcolor="bbffbb"
| 127 || August 20 || Dodgers || 7–6 (13) || Romero (1–0) || Hawksworth (2–4) || || 45,195 || 59–68
|- align="center" bgcolor="bbffbb"
| 128 || August 21 || Dodgers || 5–3 || Millwood (1–1) || Billingsley (10–10) || Betancourt (2) || 49,083 || 60–68
|- align="center" bgcolor="bbffbb"
| 129 || August 22 || Astros || 9–5 || Chacín (10–10) || Myers (3–13) || Betancourt (3) || 27,166 || 61–68
|- align="center" bgcolor="bbffbb"
| 130 || August 23 || Astros || 8–6 || Belisle (8–4) || Rodriguez (2–2) || Brothers (1) || 31,179 || 62–68
|- align="center" bgcolor="bbffbb"
| 131 || August 24 || Astros || 7–6 (10) || Belisle (9–4) || Rodríguez (1–5) || || 30,333 || 63–68
|- align="center" bgcolor="ffbbbb"
| 132 || August 26 || @ Dodgers || 6–1 || Lilly (8–13) || Rogers (6–3) || || 38,960 || 63–69
|- align="center" bgcolor="ffbbbb"
| 133 || August 27 || @ Dodgers || 7–6 (11) || MacDougal (1–1) || Hammel (7–13) || || 35,537 || 63–70
|- align="center" bgcolor="bbffbb"
| 134 || August 28 || @ Dodgers || 7–6 || Chacín (11–10) || Eovaldi (1–2) || Betancourt (4) || 38,503 || 64–70
|- align="center" bgcolor="ffbbbb"
| 135 || August 29 || @ Diamondbacks || 5–1 || Hudson (14–9) || White  (1–1) || Putz (34) || 19,478 || 64–71
|- align="center" bgcolor="ffbbbb"
| 136 || August 30 || @ Diamondbacks || 9–4 || Miley (2–1) || Cook (3–8) || || 20,231 || 64–72
|- align="center" bgcolor="ffbbbb"
| 137 || August 31 || @ Diamondbacks || 4–2 || Collmenter (9–8) || Rogers (6–4) || Putz (35) || 23,062 || 64–73
|-

|-  bgcolor="ffbbbb"
|- align="center" bgcolor="bbffbb"
| 138 || September 2 || @ Padres || 3–0 || Millwood (2–1) || Harang (12–5) || Betancourt (5) || 22,070 || 65–73
|- align="center" bgcolor="bbffbb"
| 139 || September 3 || @ Padres || 5–4 || White (2–1) || Luebke (5–8) || Betancourt (6) || 23,974 || 66–73
|- align="center" bgcolor="ffbbbb"
| 140 || September 4 || @ Padres || 7–2 || Latos (7–13) || Cook (3–9) || || 24,661 || 66–74
|- align="center" bgcolor="ffbbbb"
| 141 || September 5 || Diamondbacks || 10–7 || Miley (3–1) || Rogers (6–5) || || 40,342 || 66–75
|- align="center" bgcolor="bbffbb"
| 142 || September 6 || Diamondbacks || 8–3 || Belisle (10–4) || Hernandez (4–4) || || 25,691 || 67–75
|- align="center" bgcolor="ffbbbb"
| 143 || September 7 || Diamondbacks || 5–3 || Saunders (10–12) || Millwood (2–2) || Putz (37) || 25,320 || 67–76
|- align="center" bgcolor="ffbbbb"
| 144 || September 9 || Reds || 4–1 || Bailey (8–7) || Chacín (11–11) || Cordero (32) || 40,114 || 67–77
|- align="center" bgcolor="bbffbb"
| 145 || September 10 || Reds || 12–7 || White (3–1) || Maloney (0–2) || || 38,499 || 68–77
|- align="center" bgcolor="bbffbb"
| 146 || September 11 || Reds || 4–1 || Pomeranz (1–0) || Vólquez (5–5) || Hammel (1) || 39,538 || 69–77
|- align="center" bgcolor="ffbbbb"
| 147 || September 13 || @ Brewers || 2–1 (11) || Loe (4–7) || Lindstrom (2–2) || || 37,120 || 69–78
|- align="center" bgcolor="bbffbb"
| 148 || September 14 || @ Brewers || 6–2 || Millwood (3–2) || Marcum (12–7) || || 38,302 || 70–78
|- align="center" bgcolor="ffbbbb"
| 149 || September 15 || Giants || 8–5 || Vogelsong (11–7) || Chacín (11–12) || Casilla (4) || 34,364 || 70–79
|- align="center" bgcolor="ffbbbb"
| 150 || September 16 || Giants || 9–1 || Bumgarner (12–12) || White (3–2) || || 47,302 || 70–80
|- align="center" bgcolor="ffbbbb"
| 151 || September 17 || Giants || 6–5 || Joaquín (1–0) || Street (1–4) || Casilla (5) || 38,961 || 70–81
|- align="center" bgcolor="ffbbbb"
| 152 || September 18 || Giants || 12–5 || Cain (12–10) || Rogers (6–6) || || 31,875 || 70–82
|- align="center" bgcolor="ffbbbb"
| 153 || September 19 || Padres || 8–2 || Luebke (6–9) || Millwood (3–3) || || 27,450 || 70–83
|- align="center" bgcolor="ffbbbb"
| 154 || September 20 || Padres || 2–1 || Latos (8–14) || Chacín (11–13) || Bell (40) || 32,465 || 70–84
|- align="center" bgcolor="ffbbbb"
| 155 || September 21 || Padres || 4–0 || Bass (2–0) || Cook (3–10) || Bell (41) || 31,457 || 70–85
|- align="center" bgcolor="ffbbbb"
| 156 || September 22 || @ Astros || 9–6 || Sosa (3–5) || White (3–3) || Melancon (20) || 20,773 || 70–86
|- align="center" bgcolor="ffbbbb"
| 157 || September 23 || @ Astros || 11–2 || Myers (7–13) || Pomeranz (1–1) || || 22,467 || 70–87
|- align="center" bgcolor="bbffbb"
| 158 || September 24 || @ Astros || 4–2 (13) || M. Reynolds (1–2) || Lyles (2–8) || Betancourt (7) || 26,209 || 71–87
|- align="center" bgcolor="bbffbb"
| 159 || September 25 || @ Astros || 19–3 || Millwood (4–3) || Harrell (0–2) || || 21,621 || 72–87
|- align="center" bgcolor="ffbbbb"
| 160 || September 26 || @ Giants || 3–1 || Vogelsong (13–7) || Chacín (11–14) || Casilla (6) || 41,956 || 72–88
|- align="center" bgcolor="ffbbbb"
| 161 || September 27 || @ Giants || 7–0 || Bumgarner (13–13) || White (3–4) || || 42,370 || 72–89
|- align="center" bgcolor="bbffbb"
| 162 || September 28 || @ Giants || 6–3 || Pomeranz (2–1) || Surkamp (2–2) || Betancourt (8) || 41,873 || 73–89
|-

Player stats

Batting

Starters by position 
Note: Pos = Position; G = Games played; AB = At bats; H = Hits; Avg. = Batting average; HR = Home runs; RBI = Runs batted in

Other batters 
Note: G = Games played; AB = At bats; H = Hits; Avg. = Batting average; HR = Home runs; RBI = Runs batted in

Pitching

Starting pitchers 
Note: G = Games pitched; IP = Innings pitched; W = Wins; L = Losses; ERA = Earned run average; SO = Strikeouts

Other pitchers 
Note: G = Games pitched; IP = Innings pitched; W = Wins; L = Losses; ERA = Earned run average; SO = Strikeouts

Relief pitchers 
Note: G = Games pitched; W = Wins; L = Losses; SV = Saves; ERA = Earned run average; SO = Strikeouts

Notes
 On September 24, the Rockies and Houston Astros played the 200,000th game in MLB history.  The Rockies won 4-2 in 13 innings.

Farm system

References

External links
2011 Colorado Rockies season at Baseball Reference
2011 Colorado Rockies season Official Site

Colorado Rockies seasons
Colorado Rockies
Colorado Rockies
2010s in Denver